The British Academy Games Award for British Game is an award presented annually by the British Academy of Film and Television Arts (BAFTA). It is given in honour of "the best British game of the year, across all genres and platforms. Creative control and overall development must be led by a British development studio.". The first ceremony to introduce the award was the 9th British Academy Games Awards in 2013, and was received by Fireproof Games' The Room.

Since its inception, the award has been given to four games, all from separate developers and publishers. As developers, Playground Games have been nominated the most times on three occasions. As publishers, both Sony Computer Entertainment and Warner Bros. Interactive Entertainment share the most nominations with four occasions each. Forza Horizon 5, developed by Playground Games and published by Xbox Game Studios, is the most recent recipient of the award.

Winners and nominees 
In the following table, the years are listed as per BAFTA convention, and generally correspond to the year of game release in the United Kingdom.

Multiple wins and nominations

Developers 
The following developers received two or more British Game nominations:

Publishers 
The following publishers received two or more British Game nominations:

References

British Academy Games Awards